This is a list of McNeese Cowboys football players in the NFL Draft. Note that McNeese State University branded its athletic program as "McNeese State" until dropping the word "State" effective with the 2015–16 school year.

Key

Selections

References

McNeese

McNeese Cowboys NFL Draft